Betadur is a village in Dharwad district of Karnataka, India. It is located in the Kundgol taluk.

Demographics
As of the 2011 Census of India there were 900 households in Betadur and a total population of 4,497 consisting of 2,307 males and 2,190 females. There were 548 children ages 0–6.

References

Villages in Dharwad district